La pecera de Eva is a Spanish television series produced by Isla Producciones starring Alexandra Jiménez as Eva Padrón, a psychologist working in a high school. Its four seasons aired from January 2010 to December 2011 on Telecinco, LaSiete and Factoría de Ficción.

Premise 
The fiction focuses on how Eva Padrón (Alexandra Jiménez), a psychologist entering to work in a high school (the Instituto Unamuno), deals with the issues troubling the students who attend to her consultation, including the likes of abortions, suicides, murders, deficits in social functioning, exclusion, bullying, obesity, masturbation or stuttering.

Cast 
 Alexandra Jiménez as Eva Padrón.
  as María Padrón.
  as Martín.
 Ana del Rey as Olivia.
  as Maca.
  as Nacho.
  as Hugo.
  as Fernando.
  as Fernando's mother.
 Nasser Saleh as Leo.
 Aura Garrido as Esther.
Introduced in season 2
 Vicky Luengo as Ariadna Solano, "Ari".
 Miriam Raya as Carla Berlanga.
 Carlos Martínez as Jacobo Suárez, "Jaki".
 Jorge Clemente as Manuel Zafra, "Manu".
Introduced in season 3
  as La López.
  as César Camacho.
 Susana Abaitúa as Ana.
 .
 María Hervás as Sonia.
  as Taher.
 Ahmed Younoussi.
 Eduardo Ferré.
Introduced in season 4
  as Poli.
  as Juan.
  as Andrea.
 Beatriz Pascual as Bea.
 Melanie Blanco as Pilar.
 Sergio Parralejo as Rober.

Production and release 
Produced by Isla Producciones, shooting began by November 2009. Following its release on Telecinco on 10 January 2010, the series was moved to the sister channel LaSiete, starting to be broadcast from Monday through Friday. The series was again moved to Factoría de Ficción (FDF) for its fourth season. The broadcasting run ended after 247 episodes, on 4 December 2011.

References 

Spanish teen drama television series
2010s Spanish drama television series
2010 Spanish television series debuts
2011 Spanish television series endings
Telecinco network series
Spanish-language television shows
2010s high school television series
2010s teen drama television series
Television series about educators